Ann-Marie Pelchat  (born 30 May 1974) is a Canadian freestyle skier. She was born in Lévis, Quebec. She competed at the 1998 Winter Olympics, where she placed fifth in women's moguls.

References

External links 
 

1974 births
People from Lévis, Quebec
Sportspeople from Quebec
Living people
Canadian female freestyle skiers
Olympic freestyle skiers of Canada
Freestyle skiers at the 1998 Winter Olympics